The following are the list of Indonesian diplomats that served as Permanent Representative of the Republic of Indonesia to the Association of Southeast Asian Nations (ASEAN).

See also 
 List of Indonesian ambassadors
 List of diplomatic missions of Indonesia

Reference 

Ambassadors of Indonesia